This is a list of Texas Longhorns men's basketball players who played at least one game in the National Basketball Association (NBA).

References

External links
Texas Athletics
The Longhorn Foundation
The University of Texas at Austin

Texas
Texas Longhorns in the NBA
Texas Longhorns NBA